Nueva Providencia is a corregimiento in Colón District, Colón Province, Panama with a population of 5,813 as of 2010. Its population as of 1990 was 1,253; its population as of 2000 was 3,065.

References

Corregimientos of Colón Province